"Stars" is a song recorded by American singer and songwriter Erika Jayne for her debut studio album Pretty Mess (2009). Released as the album's second single, the song was first distributed digitally on December 6, 2007, accompanied by a CD single released in the same month. The CD single included nine remixes of the song in addition to the single version. "Stars" is featured in the comedy film American Summer (2011) starring Efren Ramirez and Matthew Lillard.

Musically, the track is a house song, with an EDM influence. Commercially successful, "Stars" managed to peak at number one on the US Billboard Hot Dance Club Play in 2008, becoming her second consecutive single to do so, following "Roller Coaster". Music video for the song was directed by actor and film director Scott Speer. The music video for "Stars" spent 12 weeks (peaking at number 2) on Logo TV’s The Click List: Top 10 Videos.

Track listing

Charts

Weekly charts

Year-end charts

See also 
List of number-one dance singles of 2008 (US)

References 

2007 singles
2007 songs
Songs written by Eric Kupper